Undu bay is a bay in Estonia. It in the northern Gulf of Riga and is highly isolated. It is characterized by having muddy deposits, dense bottom vegetation, and low salinity. In 2005, an exotic species of crustacean, Gammarus lacustris, was identified in the bay.

See also
List of lakes of Estonia

Lakes of Estonia
Saaremaa Parish
Landforms of Saare County

References